Pegguy Arphexad (born 18 May 1973) is a French former professional footballer who played as a goalkeeper.

Early life
Arphexad was born in Les Abymes, Guadeloupe.

Club career
Arphexad began in the French League with Lens and played in the last three matches of the 1995–96 Division 1. The next season, he played in two league matches on loan for Lille.

Leicester City
In August 1997, Arphexad began his time in the Premier League with Leicester City. During Leicester's successful 1999–2000 League Cup campaign he started ahead of Tim Flowers and saved two crucial penalties in a penalty shootout against Fulham in the quarter final. He earned his first ever winner's medal as an unused substitute in the final. In that season he also came on as a substitute for the injured Flowers in Leicester's penalty shootout win over Arsenal in an FA Cup fourth round replay, saving penalties from Lee Dixon and Gilles Grimandi as Leicester progressed. Arphexad played a big role in Liverpool's failure to qualify for the UEFA Champions League in 1999–2000. He produced an inspired performance to deny the Reds a much needed three points at Anfield in May 2000. His heroics that night clearly impressed Gérard Houllier, who moved swiftly to sign Arphexad on a free transfer under the Bosman ruling during the summer. Arphexad claimed that he would have stayed at Leicester had he been guaranteed a role as the first choice keeper, but the arrival of Flowers after the departure of Kasey Keller meant that he felt that he had the option of being a backup at a mid-table club or a backup at a club challenging for the title.

Liverpool
Arphexad won six medals with Liverpool, all as an unused substitute. These included three in Liverpool's treble winning 2000–01 season, where they won the FA Cup, the Football League Cup and the UEFA Cup. Two subsequent medals followed the following season as Liverpool claimed both the Charity Shield and the European Super Cup. In the 2001–02 season, he was the starting goalkeeper in the opening match that ended in a 2-1 win against West Ham United. His second and last league appearance for Liverpool was on 9 February 2002 in a 6-0 win against Ipswich Town, replacing Jerzy Dudek during the second half.

Arphexad earned a second League Cup winners medal in the 2002–03 season and was released by Liverpool that summer, later having spells with Coventry City and Notts County. He also rejected a move to Chester City claiming that he would not be prepared to join a club playing lower than the second division.

International career
Arphexad made one appearance for the France national under-21 team in 1994.

After football
Rumours surfaced online that Arphexad turned to making pornographic content after a failed career in acting. However, in an interview with the Leicester Mercury, he stated the rumours were not true, whilst going on to say that he now works in sports insurance. He is currently works for Henner Sports as a European Business Officer.

Honours
Leicester City
Football League Cup: 1999–2000

'''Liverpool
Football League Cup: 2000–01, 2002–03
FA Cup: 2000–01
UEFA Cup: 2000–01
FA Charity Shield: 2001
UEFA Super Cup: 2001

References

External links

1973 births
Living people
People from Les Abymes
French footballers
Guadeloupean footballers
Association football goalkeepers
Stade Brestois 29 players
Lille OSC players
RC Lens players
Leicester City F.C. players
Liverpool F.C. players
Stockport County F.C. players
Coventry City F.C. players
Notts County F.C. players
Olympique de Marseille players
Ligue 1 players
Premier League players
English Football League players
UEFA Cup winning players
France under-21 international footballers
French expatriate footballers
Guadeloupean expatriate footballers
Expatriate footballers in England
French expatriate sportspeople in England
French people of Guadeloupean descent